The Trillium Line, also called O-Train Line 2, is a diesel light rail transit (DLRT) service in Ottawa, Ontario, Canada, operated by OC Transpo. The line has been closed since May 2020 for service expansion.

The line is a single track, with three passing sidings on dedicated rights-of-way shared with Ottawa Central freight trains south of Walkley Yard, which occasionally serve the National Research Council of Canada's Automotive and Surface Transportation Research Centre. Despite being a local public transit line, it is actually a federally regulated mainline railway and operated under the official name "Capital Railway", which appears on the trains in addition to the service's logo. All stations except  have single platforms.

Between 2013 and 2015, the line was upgraded and its fleet replaced, cutting wait times during peak periods from 15 minutes to 12 minutes.

During its closure, service along the line is being provided by buses. The upgraded and expanded line is expected to reopen in 2023.

History

Pilot project

The Trillium Line was introduced on October 15, 2001, as a pilot project to provide an alternative to the Transitway bus rapid transit on which Ottawa had long depended exclusively for its high-grade transit service. The single-track line operated with five stations and a single passing loop at Carleton station.

It runs on an existing Canadian Pacific Railway track (Ellwood and Prescott subdivisions of Bytown and Prescott Railway), so the only construction work necessary was to build the stations themselves and the passing tracks necessary to allow trains to operate in both directions.

From 2001 until 2015, the system used three diesel-powered Bombardier Talent BR643 low-floor diesel multiple unit trains. It was, however, described as "light rail", partly because plans called for it to be extended into Ottawa's downtown as a tramway-like service, and partly because the Talent vehicles, though designed for mainline railways in Europe, are much smaller and lighter than most mainline trains in North America, and do not meet the Association of American Railroads' standards for crash strength. Ottawa is also authorized to run trains with only a single operator and no other crew, something rare on mainline railways in North America.

Until late 2014, the official name of the diesel-powered, north–south line was "O-Train". After construction started on a second, east–west light rail line (the Confederation Line), the O-Train name was applied to the entire system, and the north–south line was renamed the "Trillium Line".

Original service

Ticketing on the Trillium Line originally worked entirely on a proof-of-payment basis; there were no ticket barriers or turnstiles, and the driver did not check fares. Occasionally, OC Transpo Special Constables or other employees prompted passengers for proof-of-payment. Tickets can be purchased from a vending machine on the platform, and certain bus passes are also valid for the Trillium Line. Trillium Line tickets were exchanged for bus transfers upon boarding a bus. Although bus transfers can be used to board the O-Train, prepaid bus tickets cannot.

The European trains are narrower than the North American standard. In order to enable night-time use of the line by standard-width freight services, retractable platform extenders are mounted at each station (other than Bayview which is constructed on its own private rail spur). Passengers gain access to the Trillium Line on these extenders. If the line is used for freight, the extenders are retracted allowing a wider train to pass through the station. The extender interface with the train has been refined over time, and cyclists and wheelchair users now have no trouble accessing the train.

The service frequency of a train every fifteen minutes made it possible to run the line with a fleet of just three trains (of which only two were in service at any given time) and a single track, apart from passing sidings at Carleton station.

The Trillium Line hit the 1-millionth rider mark on May 29, 2002, the 5-millionth mark on January 21, 2005, and the 10-millionth in late 2010. In mid-2011, the Trillium Line carried an average of approximately 12,000 riders each day.

Awards
In June 2002, the O-Train Light Rail Transit project received the Canadian Urban Transit Association’s Corporate Innovation Award.

On January 16, 2003, the Ontario chapter of the American Public Works Association (APWA) presented the City of Ottawa, Canadian Pacific Railway and Morrison Hershfield with the APWA Public Works Project of the Year award in the transportation category. This award was established to highlight excellence in the management and administration of public works projects by recognizing the alliance between the managing agency, the consultant and the contractors who, working together, complete public works projects.

A third award the Trillium Line light rail transit project received was in May 2003, in the sustainable transportation category of the FCM-CH2M Hill Sustainable Community Awards.

Criticism of pilot project
The main complaints about the Trillium Line pilot have revolved around its placement and ridership levels. The Trillium Line's route was determined by existing railway tracks, rather than the parts of the city that needed public transport, which would have required new tracks to be laid. Carleton University students, however, benefited from the Trillium Line pilot project, as it connected the university to the busy Ottawa Transitway system.

The other criticism is that there is very low ridership of the trains compared to some very crowded bus lines such as the 90–99 series routes. One fully loaded Trillium Line train carries 285 passengers compared to 131 passengers for an articulated bus. The O-Train schedule is limited by track capacity.

Early extension plans

In July 2006, Ottawa City Council approved a north–south light rail expansion project. The project would have terminated diesel light rail service on the Trillium Line so as to reuse its right-of-way for a double-track, electric light rail line that would have extended west from the University of Ottawa to Bayview then south to Leitrim and then west to Barrhaven. However, in December 2006, Ottawa City Council cancelled this project, thus leaving the diesel-powered Trillium Line unchanged.

Service improvements
On May 18, 2011, OC Transpo approved a $200,000 study to expand the Trillium Line. The $59-million proposal included the purchase of six new trainsets and track improvements that would decrease headways from 15 minutes to 8 minutes. The project would finally cost $60.3million.

In mid-2013, service on the Trillium Line was suspended for four months to implement service and track improvements such as new station platforms and two new passing tracks (near Brookfield and Gladstone). Upgrades were also made to the signal system, train controls, stations, tracks and train yard. A new centralized traffic control system was installed to improve safety and efficiency. Six new Alstom Coradia LINT trainsets (replacing the three older Bombardier Talent units) and the two extra passing loops allowed the number of trains on the line to double to four.

Expanded service began on March 2, 2015, but suffered numerous problems during the first week. Although the changes were intended to improve frequency to eight minutes, the Trillium Line would ultimately operate at twelve minute frequency. After the completion of the Stage 2 project, the line was originally planned to continue operating using single-car trains; however, because of the lower-than-intended frequency, the city was forced to adjust the Stage 2 plan to include longer trains and platforms to compensate.

Derailment 
On August 11, 2014, train C3 derailed while traveling northbound over the switch just south of Carleton station. The cause was determined to be a faulty spring switch that had not closed properly as well as the operator failing to follow regulations and physically inspect the switch after spotting a signal irregularity. No serious injuries occurred as a result of the derailment; however, train C3 received damage and was taken out of service. C3 was never repaired and never returned to service and as a result the line continued to operate with only two operational trains until the following March when the new Alstom LINT trains entered service. In June 2017, the spring switches at Carleton were replaced with powered switches.

Stage 2 expansion 

As part of the city's Stage 2 LRT project, the Trillium Line will be extended  in the south, including a  branch to Macdonald–Cartier International Airport and the EY Centre, with four new stations at South Keys, Leitrim, Bowesville and Limebank in Riverside South. There will be a new passing loop at South Keys station and the track will be fully doubled from the Leitrim Road overpass to Limebank station. The full extension will be grade separated. In addition, two more stations will be built along the existing portion of the line at Gladstone and Walkley. The project will also include a number of other significant upgrades including the lengthening of all existing passing loops, the purchase of seven new trains, the doubling in length of all existing platforms, the grade separation of the Ellwood diamond to allow Via trains to cross underneath the Trillium Line, the rehabilitation of rail bridges over the Rideau River and of the Dow's Lake rail tunnel, the upgrading of the signalling system to allow the implementation of positive train control, the construction of several new pedestrian tunnels and overpasses, and numerous guideway and vehicle rehabilitation projects. The contract for this project was approved on March 7, 2019, by city council, with construction of the airport spur beginning in mid-2019. The project was expected to be completed by the fourth quarter of 2022 but has been delayed to May 2023 at the earliest.

The  airport link will run from Macdonald–Cartier International Airport north to South Keys station, where riders will need to change trains to continue to Bayview station. South Keys station will feature an island platform to facilitate cross-platform transfers for passengers arriving from the airport branch to trains bound for Bayview station. The city is not contributing any money to this spur, with the funding instead coming from the federal and provincial governments, as well as the airport authority.

On February 22, 2019, the city announced that the selected proponent to construct the project was TransitNEXT, a wholly owned subsidiary of SNC-Lavalin. This decision was controversial as the federal government and SNC-Lavalin were involved in a political scandal at the time, which led to extra scrutiny by city councillors, with some calling for a delay on the vote to approve the contract in order to allow more time for review. Ultimately Council voted not to delay the approval and the contract was approved on March 7, 2019. It was later revealed that TransitNEXT's bid had not met the minimum technical scoring threshold in order to be considered, which continued the controversy. The city eventually explained that the decision to award the contract to TransitNEXT was done at the discretion of city staff to get a better deal for the city and was within the rules of the procurement process. An investigation conducted by the city's auditor general later confirmed that the authority delegated by council gave city staff sole discretion on whether to allow a bid to proceed even if it had not met the minimum scoring threshold, and that staff had otherwise correctly followed the entire procurement process that had been approved by council.

Work on the Stage 2 extension began in mid-2019, starting with the clear-cutting of trees along the corridors that will be used by the extension. Construction of the airport spur is expected to be completed in 2020 to give the airport authority time to rebuild the terminal and connect it to the future station.

Further extensions 

Extending the Trillium Line across the Ottawa River into Gatineau across the Chief William Commanda Bridge had been proposed as early as the original pilot project proposal. The city's certificate of fitness for the Trillium Line, issued by the Canadian Transportation Authority in 2001, indicates that it operates between the provinces of Ontario and Quebec, despite the line never having actually operated across the river. The city even considered converting the rail bridge into a pedestrian crossing at one point. When the city announced the contract awards for Stage 2, it also presented a map of the O-Train network that included proposed extensions that would be a part of a Stage 3 phase, including extensions to Kanata, Barrhaven, and Gatineau. On September 24, 2019, the cities of Ottawa and Gatineau jointly announced that they no longer intended to use the Chief William Commanda Bridge for any kind of rail connection, citing capacity concerns at Bayview station. Despite the announcement, the future of the bridge remains uncertain since city staff later indicated that the bridge is still in the city's long term transit plans, though it could be converted for use as a pedestrian bridge in the interim. More on the future of the bridge as a rail link will be announced in the second quarter of 2020 when the city of Gatineau will present the results of a long-term transit study.

Stations

, ticket barriers are installed and operational in all Line 2 stations. They were initially installed in all stations except for Bayview in order to test the hardware and software of the fare gate system before it was installed in all thirteen stations on the Line 1 Confederation Line.

The Trillium Line stations have large, bus-style sheltered waiting areas for passengers. All stations have level boarding platforms to allow for wheelchair access and easier boarding for all passengers. Elevators are available at Greenboro (for Transitway riders), Dow's Lake (for Line 2 riders) and Bayview (for train transfers within the fare-paid zone).

Fleet

The Trillium Line initially used three Bombardier Talent diesel multiple unit (DMU) trains for service. Each train (numbered C1–C3) consisted of three cars, with the front and rear powered and the centre towed. The trains were originally ordered by Deutsche Bahn and later delivered to OC Transpo. After being retired in 2015, the units were put up for auction multiple times but a deal to sell the vehicles was never successfully established. They are now slated to be scrapped.

In September 2011, Alstom announced that it would deliver six new two-car Coradia LINT train sets in 2013; the trains were handed over to OC Transpo in June 2013. These trains were put into service on March 2, 2015, and the Bombardier Talent units were subsequently retired. 

On May 3, 2018, it was announced that the city would be purchasing seven new Stadler FLIRT trains to use on the extended Trillium Line after the completion of Stage 2. The new trains will operate alongside coupled pairs of the existing LINT trains on the main line as part of a mixed fleet. These vehicles will be manufactured in Switzerland before being transported to Canada for final assembly. The trains will have a diesel-electric drive with the possibility of future electrification. The first FLIRT vehicle was delivered on October 7, 2021, and began testing on the weekend of January 15, 2022.

Facilities
Train sets are stored at the Walkley Yard located northeast of the Greenboro station. Before their retirement, the Bombardier Talent trainsets were maintained by Bombardier Transportation at the Walkley facilities. Bombardier continues to perform maintenance of the Trillium Line fleet, which included standstill maintenance of the retired Bombardier Talent trains until March 8, 2018. The Walkley Yard was built in 1955 by the National Capital Commission for the Canadian National Railways and later sold to the Canadian Pacific Railway. The yard has enclosed buildings for repairs and outdoor storage tracks.

As part of the Stage 2 project, a new maintenance facility will be built adjacent and to the west of the existing facilities. The construction of the new yard facilities began in 2019.

See also

 Confederation Line
 Letsgomoose
 Light rail in Canada
 Light rail in North America
 List of tram and light rail transit systems
 Prince of Wales Bridge
 Rapibus

References

External links

 OC Transpo – O-Train Line 2 Trillium Line (official site)
 City of Ottawa - LRT Stage 2 - Trillium Line South Extension including map and station renderings
 2002 O-Train Evaluation Report
 Transport Canada O-Train Light Rail Project Summary circa 2010 (Internet Archive)
 O-Train construction pictures
 Salient Features of the O-Train (Trillium) Route Between Bayview and Greenboro as of August 2017

O-Train
Railway lines opened in 2001
Light rail in Canada
2001 establishments in Ontario
Rapid transit lines in Canada